Goodenia cusackiana is a species of flowering plant in the family Goodeniaceae and is endemic to the north-west of Western Australia. It an erect herb, densely covered with silvery hairs and has a woody stem, narrow elliptic to lance-shaped leaves, and racemes of yellow flowers.

Description
Flowering occurs from July to September.

Taxonomy and naming
This species was first formally described in 1896 by Ferdinand von Mueller who gave it the name Velleia cusackiana in The Victorian Naturalist from material collected near the "Fortesque-River" by William Henry Cusack. In 1990 Roger Charles Carolin changed the name to Goodenia cusackiana in the journal Telopea.

Distribution and habitat
This goodenia grows in rocky soil in the Pilbara and Carnarvon bioregions of Western Australia.

Conservation status
Goodenia cusackiana is classified as "not threatened" by the Government of Western Australia Department of Parks and Wildlife.

References

cusackiana
Eudicots of Western Australia
Plants described in 1896
Taxa named by Ferdinand von Mueller